Lawrence Patrick Henry (27 July 1934 – 4 March 2014) was a South African Roman Catholic archbishop.

Born in Cape Town, South Africa, Henry was ordained to the priesthood for the Roman Catholic Archdiocese of Cape Town in 1962. In 1987, he was appointed titular bishop of Cenculiana and auxiliary bishop of the Cape Town Archdiocese. Henry was appointed Archbishop of the Cape Town Archdiocese in 1990 and retired in 2009. He died in 2014, aged 79.

Notes

1934 births
2014 deaths
20th-century Roman Catholic archbishops in South Africa
21st-century Roman Catholic archbishops in South Africa
People from Cape Town
Place of death missing
Roman Catholic archbishops of Cape Town